Groupe Bruxelles Lambert (GBL), is a Belgian holding company invested in various sectors within companies that can be considered marketleaders and in which it can play an active role as a professional shareholder over the long term.

In the last few years, the holding largely divested its stakes in the energy sector to turn to sustainable growth company focused on consumer goods or services. The firm is directed by Ian Gallienne. The company had a net asset value of EUR 22.5 billion and a market capitalisation of EUR 15.3 billion at the end of September 2021. GBL invests in both listed and private companies. The company is controlled by Pargesa S.A., which holds 29.13% of the outstanding shares and 44.23% of the voting rights. Pargesa S.A. itself is held jointly by the Power Corporation of Canada (Canada) and Frère (Belgium) groups, providing GBL with a stable and solid shareholder base. Since 1990, the two groups have been bound by a shareholders’ agreement. This agreement, which was extended in December 2012, until 2029, includes an extension possibility.

History
Groupe Bruxelles Lambert was founded in 1972, when the Lambert banking family merged their holding companies ″Compagnie Lambert pour l'Industrie et la Finance″ and ″Cofinter″ with two holding companies belonging to the ″Groupe de Launoit″. The new firm controlled two Belgian banks, the ″Banque Lambert″ and the ″Banque de Bruxelles″, which were subsequently merged in 1975 to form the ″Banque Bruxelles Lambert″ (BBL). Groupe Bruxelles Lambert sold BBL to the ″ING Group″ in 1998, which is now known as ″ING Belgium″.

GBL is best known in the United States as one of the namesakes of Drexel Burnham Lambert, the investment bank that pioneered trading in junk bonds. The Lamberts owned a research boutique, William D. Witter (also known as Lambert Brussels Witter), which merged with then-Drexel Burnham in 1976. In return, GBL received a 26% stake in the merged company, and six seats on the board.

Since 2012, GBL divested more and more its stakes in Total and Engie. These two companies in the energy sector that constituted 41.5% of the value of GBL in 2011, only represented 4.2% of the portfolio on 31 March 2017. Simultaneously, GBL expanded into new business segments by acquiring stakes in SGS, Umicore, Adidas, Ontex, Burberry, Parques Reunidos.and Sienna Capital S.a R.l.

Portfolio
As at 31 March 2017, the portfolio had the following (non-exhaustively).

The company address is Avenue Marnix 24, B-1000 Brussels, Belgium.

References

External links

Companies based in Brussels
Companies listed on Euronext Brussels
Investment management companies of Belgium
Drexel Burnham Lambert
Holding companies of Belgium
Belgian companies established in 1902
Holding companies established in 1902